Havrebjerg is a village on Zealand, Denmark. It is located in Slagelse Municipality.

History
Maren Sørensen, considered to be the first female Danish priest, was ordained by Havrebjerg by the independent Grundtvigian priest Niels Dael in 1940. 

A community freezer was built in the village in 1951. In 1977, when household freezers became more common, the community freezer was disestablished. The building today acts as a museum for local history.

Notable residents
 Søren Peter Lauritz Sørensen (1868–1939), chemist and inventor of the pH-scale.

Gallery

References

Cities and towns in Region Zealand
Slagelse Municipality
Villages in Denmark